Kostyantyn Rybaruk (born 30 August 1994) is a Ukrainian cyclist. He participated in the road race and time trial at the 2017 UCI Road World Championships. He also participated in the 2013 Grand Prix of Adygeya, the 2013 Grand Prix of Sochi, the 2015 Tour of Bulgaria, the 2016 Tour of Ukraine, the 2017 Tour of Ukraine, and the 2018 Tour of Mediterrennean; along with several other races.

Major results

2014 
 5th National Championships Ukraine U23 - Road Race
 51st Race Horizon Park day 1

2015 
 19th Odessa Grand Prix day 1
 28th Grand Prix Minsk
 44th Horizon Park Race Maidan

2016 
 41st UEC Road European Championships U23 - ITT
 72nd Coppa dei Laghi-Trofeo Almar
 71st Grand Prix Minx
 26th Minsk Cup
 2nd National Championships Ukraine U23 - ITT
 6th Hets Hatsafon
 43rd Horizon Park Classic
 24th Horizon Park for Peace

2017 
53rd UCI Road World Championships - ITT
22nd Tour de Ribas
11th National Championships Ukraine - Road Race
17th National Championships Ukraine - ITT
67th Horizon Park Classic
90th Horizon Park Race Maidan
37th Horizon Park for Peace

2019 
 15th National Championships Ukraine - Road Race
 8th National Championships Ukraine - ITT
 33rd Tour de Ribas

References

1994 births
Living people
Ukrainian male cyclists
21st-century Ukrainian people